Ralph Harold Boston (born May 9, 1939) is a retired American track athlete who received three Olympic medals and became the first person to break the  barrier in the long jump.

Early years and education
Boston was born in Laurel, Mississippi.  As a student at Tennessee State University, he won the 1960 National Collegiate Athletic Association title in the long jump.  In August of the same year, he broke the world record in the event, held by Jesse Owens for 25 years, at the Mt. SAC Relays.  Already the world record holder, he improved the mark past 27 feet, jumping 27' 1/2" at the Modesto Relays on May 27, 1961.

Athletic career

Boston won the Amateur Athletic Union (AAU) national championship in the long jump six times in a row from 1961 to 1966. He also had the longest triple jump for an American in 1963. He returned to the Tokyo Olympics as the world record holder after losing the record to Igor Ter-Ovanesyan, then regaining the record a couple of months before the games, first in Kingston, Jamaica and improving it at the 1964 Olympic Trials.  In the Olympic final, Boston exchanged the lead with Ter-Ovanesyan.  Going into the fifth round, Boston was leading but fouled while both Lynn Davies and Ter-Ovanesyan jumped past him.  On his final jump, he was able to jump past Ter-Ovanesyan, but could not catch Davies and ended winning the silver medal.

Boston's final record improvement to 8.35m was again at the 1965 Modesto Relays.  It was tied at altitude by Ter-Ovanesyan in 1967. In 1967, he lost the national title to Jerry Proctor.  When rival Bob Beamon was suspended from the University of Texas at El Paso, for refusing to compete against Brigham Young University, alleging it had racist policies, Boston began to coach him unofficially.  Beamon took the 1968 National Championships.  At the 1968 Olympics, Boston watched his pupil destroy the tied world record by jumping 8.90 m (29' 2 1/2"). Boston was then 29 years old. He won a bronze medal behind Beamon and Klaus Beer and retired from competitions shortly thereafter. He moved to Knoxville, Tennessee, and worked for the University of Tennessee as Coordinator of Minority Affairs and Assistant Dean of Students from 1968 to 1975.  He was the field event reporter for the CBS Sports Spectacular coverage of domestic track and field events.  He was inducted into the USA Track and Field Hall of Fame in 1974 and into the U.S. Olympic Hall of Fame in 1985.

Later years
A Los Angeles Times article on Boston from August 2, 2010, coinciding roughly with the 50th anniversary of his initial world record, described him as a divorced great-grandfather who is writing an autobiography. He splits his time between Atlanta, Georgia and Knoxville.

References

External links
 
 
 

1939 births
Living people
American male long jumpers
African-American male track and field athletes
Athletes (track and field) at the 1960 Summer Olympics
Athletes (track and field) at the 1963 Pan American Games
Athletes (track and field) at the 1964 Summer Olympics
Athletes (track and field) at the 1967 Pan American Games
Athletes (track and field) at the 1968 Summer Olympics
Olympic gold medalists for the United States in track and field
Olympic silver medalists for the United States in track and field
Olympic bronze medalists for the United States in track and field
Track and field athletes from Atlanta
Sportspeople from Knoxville, Tennessee
People from Laurel, Mississippi
Tennessee State University alumni
Track and field athletes from Mississippi
World record setters in athletics (track and field)
University of Tennessee people
Medalists at the 1968 Summer Olympics
Medalists at the 1964 Summer Olympics
Medalists at the 1960 Summer Olympics
Pan American Games gold medalists for the United States
Pan American Games medalists in athletics (track and field)
Track & Field News Athlete of the Year winners
Medalists at the 1963 Pan American Games
Medalists at the 1967 Pan American Games
21st-century African-American people
20th-century African-American sportspeople